A caddy spoon is a spoon used for measuring out tea in the form of dried tea leaves. Traditionally made of silver, they became very popular at the end of the 18th century, when this relatively inexpensive utensil can be found in practically any middle class household. Tea was sometimes stored in elaborate boxes or containers called tea caddies, and these spoons were made to be used with such containers. The caddy spoons went out of fashion in the early 20th century.

Design 

In the early period of the tea trade, the chests with tea included scoops made of sea shells in order to take a sample for tasting. This inspired shell-shaped bowls typical for the caddy spoons.  

Caddy spoon, with its shallow bowl and a fanciful stubby handle, resembles a scoop more than it does the other spoons. The silver caddy spoons can also be found in a variety of other designs, with bowls shaped like leaves, whimsical patterns, or made to resemble odd things like a huntsman's cup or a coal box, with almost all of them bearing silver hallmarks.

The earliest caddy spoons made in Sheffield had shell-shaped bowls inspired by the shell scoops included with the tea containers shipped from Asia. The early Birmingham spoons used a jockey-cap-shaped bowl.

See also
 Tea caddy
 Teaspoon

References

Bibliography
 John Norie, Caddy Spoons: An Illustrated Guide, John Murray Publishers Ltd, 1988
 
 
 
 

Spoons
Teaware